Krishnan Suthanthiran (born 1949) is an Indian-Canadian businessman, and president and founder of the Best Medical group of companies.

He was born in India, educated in Canada, and made his fortune selling medical devices and real estate in the Washington, D.C.-area.

He attended Carleton University in Ottawa, Ontario, and completed a master's degree in Mechanical Engineering in 1971. He took pre-medical courses at the University of Toronto, and worked for an oncologist in the U.S.

In 1977, he founded health care supplies distributor Best Medical International in Springfield, Virginia.

In 2005, he purchased the former company town of Kitsault, British Columbia, Canada, for US$5.7 million. The town had housed miners' families, but was abandoned in 1982.

In 2007, he established the Best Cure Foundation in Virginia as a non-profit entity to promote healthcare and education globally.

In 2013, he founded the Proud American Party, a political party in the United States.

References

External links 
 Best Medical group of companies
 Proud American Party
 Best Cure Foundation

Indian emigrants to the United States
American people of Indian descent
American businesspeople